Yuliya Siarheyeuna Novakovich (born May 6, 1989 in Pinsk) is a Belarusian weightlifter. Novakovich represented Belarus at the 2008 Summer Olympics in Beijing, where she competed for the women's heavyweight category, along with her compatriot Iryna Kulesha, who eventually won the silver medal. She placed tenth in this event, as she successfully lifted 110 kg in the snatch, and hoisted 127 kg in the clean and jerk, for a total of 237 kg.

References

External links
NBC 2008 Olympics profile

Belarusian female weightlifters
1989 births
Living people
Olympic weightlifters of Belarus
Weightlifters at the 2008 Summer Olympics
Sportspeople from Pinsk